is a junction passenger railway station  located in the town of Yazu, Yazu District, Tottori Prefecture, Japan. It is operated by the West Japan Railway Company (JR West) and the third sector company Wakasa Railway.

Lines
It is also the terminus of the 19.2 kilometer Wakasa Line on the Wakasa Railway to Wakasa Station.

Station layout
The station consists of one ground-level island platform  (Platform 1 and 2) is on the side of the station building, and the single side platform (Platform 3) is on the opposite side of the station building  connected by a level crossing. The current station building was built together with community facilities in March 2015,

Platforms

Adjacent stations

History
Kōge Station opened on 20 December 1919. The Wakasa Line began operations 20 January 1930.  With the privatization of the Japan National Railways (JNR) on 1 April 1987, the station came under the aegis of the West Japan Railway Company.

Surrounding area
Yazu Town Hall
Tottori Prefecture Yazu Government Office
Yazu Junior High School

See also
List of railway stations in Japan

References

External links 

 Kōge Station from JR-Odekake.net 

Railway stations in Tottori Prefecture
Railway stations in Japan opened in 1919
Yazu, Tottori